Kontos ("short") is a Greek surname.  Notable people with the surname include:

Apostolos Kontos (born 1947), Greek retired basketball player and coach
Chris Kontos (born 1963), Canadian retired ice hockey player
Chris Kontos (musician) (born 1968), American drummer
Dániel Köntös (born 1984), Hungarian footballer
George Kontos (born 1985), American baseball pitcher
Yannis Kontos (born 1971), Greek freelance photojournalist

Fictional characters
Stelio Kontos, a character in the television series American Dad!

See also
Adolf Konto (1911–1965), Finnish sailor

Greek-language surnames